Robert Fuchs (15 February 1847 – 19 February 1927) was an Austrian composer and music teacher. As Professor of music theory at the Vienna Conservatory, Fuchs taught many notable composers, while he was himself a highly regarded composer in his lifetime.

Biography

He was born in Frauental, Austria in 1847. He studied at the Vienna Conservatory with Felix Otto Dessoff and Joseph Hellmesberger among others. He eventually secured a teaching position there and was appointed Professor of music theory in 1875. He retained the position until 1912. He died in Vienna in 1927.

He was the youngest brother of Johann Nepomuk Fuchs, who was also a composer and an opera conductor.

Robert Fuchs taught many notable composers,

Notability

"Unfailingly tuneful and enjoyable, Robert Fuchs’s piano trios are an easily accessible way to get to know a composer whom Brahms greatly admired," noted the magazine Gramophone. "In his time Fuchs was very highly regarded, with one critic famously pointing to Fuchsisms in Mahler’s Second Symphony."

The reason his compositions did not become better known was largely that he did little to promote them, living a quiet life in Vienna and refusing to arrange concerts, even when the opportunities arose. He certainly had his admirers, among them Brahms, who almost never praised the works of other composers. But with regard to Fuchs, Brahms wrote, “Fuchs is a splendid musician, everything is so fine and so skillful, so charmingly invented, that one is always pleased.” Famous contemporary conductors, including Arthur Nikisch, Felix Weingartner and Hans Richter, championed his works when they had the opportunity but with few exceptions, it was his chamber music which was considered his finest work.

In his lifetime, his best known works were his five serenades; their popularity was so great that Fuchs acquired the nickname "Serenaden-Fuchs" (roughly, "Serenader Fox"). The serenades have been recorded by the Cologne Chamber Orchestra under Christian Ludwig for Naxos.

List of compositions

Orchestral
Symphonies
Symphony No. 1 in C major, Op. 37
Symphony No. 2 in E major, Op. 45
Symphony No. 3 in E major, Op. 79
Serenades
Serenade for string orchestra No. 1 in D major, Op. 9
Serenade for string orchestra No. 2 in C major, Op. 14
Serenade for string orchestra No. 3 in E minor, Op. 21
Serenade for string orchestra and 2 horns in G minor, Op. 51
Serenade for small orchestra in D major, Op. 53
Andante grazioso & Capriccio for string orchestra, Op.63
Piano Concerto in B minor, Op.27

Vocal
Operas
Die Königsbraut, in 3 acts, Op.46 (1889) (librettist: Ignaz Schnitzer) premiered in Vienna
Die Teufelsglocke, in 3 acts (w/o Op.) (1891) (librettist: Bernhard Buchbinder)
Choral works
Mass in G, Op. 108
Mass in D minor, Op. 116
Mass in F, without opus number

Chamber
Quintets
Quintet for clarinet and string quartet in E major, Op. 102
Quartets
String Quartet No. 1 in E major, Op. 58
String Quartet No. 2 in A minor, Op. 62
String Quartet No. 3 in C major, Op. 71
String Quartet No. 4 in A major, Op. 106
Piano Quartet No. 1 in G minor, Op. 15
Piano Quartet No. 2 in B minor, Op. 75
Trios
Trio in F minor for violin, viola, and piano, Op. 115
Seven Fantasy Pieces for violin, viola and piano, Op. 57
String Trio in A major, Op. 94
Piano Trio in C major, Op. 22
Piano Trio in B major, Op. 72
Terzetti (trios for two violins and viola) Opp. 61 Nos. 1 in E minor, 2 in D minor
Terzetto in C minor, Op. 107
Duos
Two Violins
Twenty Duos, Op. 55
Phantasiestücke, Op. 105 (16 duos)
Violin and Viola
Twelve Duets, Op. 60
Violin and Piano
Violin Sonata No. 1 in F minor, Op. 20
Violin Sonata No. 2 in D major, Op. 33
Violin Sonata No. 3 in D minor, Op. 68
Violin Sonata No. 4 in E major, Op. 77
Violin Sonata No. 5 in A major, Op. 95
Violin Sonata No. 6 in G minor, Op.103
Ten Fantasy Pieces for violin and piano, Op. 74
Viola and Piano
Viola Sonata in D minor, Op. 86
Six Fantasies for viola and piano, Op. 117
Cello and Piano
Cello Sonata No. 1 in D minor, Op. 29
Cello Sonata No. 2 in E minor, Op. 83
Seven Fantasy Pieces for cello and piano, Op. 78
Double-Bass and Piano
Double Bass Sonata, B major, Op. 97
Three Pieces for Double Bass and Piano, Op. 96

Solo
Organ
Fantasia in C major, Op. 87
Fantasia in E minor, Op. 91
Fantasia in D major, Op. 101
Variations and Fugue on an Original Theme
Piano
Improvisation for Piano, Op. 11
Piano Sonata No. 1 in G major, Op. 19
Piano Sonata No. 2 in G minor, Op. 88
Piano Sonata No. 3 in D major, Op. 109
Jugendklänge, Op. 32
Lieb' Schwesterlein (Dear Little  Sister), Op. 32, No. 14
Twelve Waltzes, Op.110
4 Klavierstücke, Op.111
Dewdrops (Tautropfen), Thirteen Pieces for Piano, Op. 112
Harp
Harp Fantasy, Op. 85

References

Some of the information on this page appears on the website of Edition Silvertrust—permission has been granted to copy, distribute and/or modify the material under the terms of the GNU Free Documentation License.

Further reading
Grote, Adalbert (1994). Robert Fuchs : Studien zu Person und Werk des Wiener Komponisten und Theorielehrers. München : Musikverlag E. Katzbichler; Berliner musikwissenschaftliche Arbeiten, Bd. 39. . .

External links

Free scores at the Mutopia Project
Information and soundbites at the Edition Sivertrust catalogue online

1847 births
1927 deaths
19th-century classical composers
19th-century male musicians
20th-century classical composers
20th-century male musicians
Austrian Romantic composers
Austrian male classical composers
People from Deutschlandsberg District
Academic staff of the University of Music and Performing Arts Vienna
Pupils of Simon Sechter